Cavalier is a fictional supervillain appearing in American comic books published by DC Comics.

Publication history 
The character first appeared in Detective Comics #81 (November 1943) and was created by Don Cameron and Bob Kane.

Fictional character biography

Mortimer Drake
Mortimer Drake was a man of exotic and idiosyncratic taste. When he found himself unable to purchase more exotic valuables for his collection legally, he resorted to theft. Donning a costume resembling that of a Musketeer, he called himself the Cavalier. His course of actions ultimately brought him into conflict with Batman and Robin. His code of gallantry was important to him; in one story, he helps an old woman carry her groceries in the middle of making his escape.

Drake matched wits against Batman and Robin several times, and escaped them in each encounter, but Batman was able to deduce the Cavalier's identity, leading to Drake's eventual imprisonment.

In Batman Family #10, Batgirl and Batwoman teamed up to defeat Killer Moth and the Cavalier. Cavalier could not find a way around his code, which prevented hitting females, but after a self-examination he concludes "the devil with gallantry" and hit Batgirl with his fist.

Five issues later, in Batman Family #15, Killer Moth teamed up with Cavalier again and made a bet with him that he could find the way into the Batcave from Batgirl before the Cavalier could get the same knowledge from Robin. While Killer Moth was led to a fake cave, Cavalier was shown a large nest, which led the Cavalier to the conclusion that Robin was an alien bird lifeform.

Before Crisis on Infinite Earths the Cavalier existed both on Earth-One and Earth-Two. The stories where he harmed women, something that neither the Earth-One nor Earth-Two versions of him would ever do, can be assigned to the alternate world of Earth-B, an alternate Earth that included stories that could not be considered canonical on Earth-One or Earth-Two. Later "Earth-B" would be formally divided into two separate Earths: Earth-Twelve and Earth-Thirty-Two.

Post-Crisis, Cavalier appeared in Justice League America #43-44 as part of a group of supervillain drinking buddies who were trying to regain their lost items of power. He was defeated by Blue Beetle, who clotheslined him in an alleyway.

During "Knightfall", he faced Batman once again, but was defeated with ease. Cavalier had become insane and was kept in Arkham Asylum. It remains to be seen how Drake went insane, or if his origin has changed because of the first crisis. The Cavalier was later said to have been in a closeted gay relationship with Captain Stingaree, another low-level Batman villain.

He appeared in Justice League of America (vol. 2) #2 as an informant for Black Lightning within the Society.

His back was broken by Bane in Secret Six #7, but he acted as a bodyguard for Leslie Thompkins in Battle for the Cowl: Gotham Gazette. Both stories were published in the spring of 2009, though their relative chronology has yet to be determined. In Red Robin #16 he is shown to still be acting as a bodyguard to Dr. Leslie Thompkins.

The Cavalier's re-entry into active crime followed, when he was seen attempting multiple small heists around Gotham, only to be foiled each time by Batman or Catwoman. However, those small crimes were merely an attempt to hide his role as the mastermind behind the embezzlement of millions of dollars from the Wayne Enterprises pension fund. Eventually, Batman and Catwoman, working together, were able to follow the money trail to Drake, expose his role in the embezzlement, and return the funds.

In September 2011, The New 52 revised the fictional history and characters portrayed in the DC Comics superhero comic book line. In this line-wide revision, Cavalier is now a user of the fictional strength-enhancing drug called Venom. He is shown battling Batwoman.

Hudson Pyle
In Batman: Legends of the Dark Knight #32-34 (June–July 1992) writer James Robinson and Tim Sale introduced a new Cavalier by the name of Hudson Pyle into the Batman official continuity in his story-arc entitled Blades. Since Blades takes place early on in Batman's career, Hudson Pyle is actually the original Cavalier, and therefore may have even influenced Mortimer Drake.

In Blades, Pyle, an ex-Hollywood stuntman looking for fame, becomes the Cavalier, a masked crimefighting vigilante that brandishes a razor-sharp sword, quick wit, and handsome smile. It is not long before the people of Gotham fall in love with the new hero. While Pyle's motives and actions are revealed to be honorable, he harbors a dark secret which ultimately leads to his downfall. Pyle is in love with a woman who is being blackmailed by gangsters, and as a result of this winds up being blackmailed as well. To save his love, Pyle is forced to commit burglaries and thus loses the confidence of the people.

Pyle soon kills the gangsters. He comes into conflict with Batman, defeating him in a sword duel. He leaves Batman, who is very weak and feverish after injuries sustained in a previous fight, and purposely charges nearby police officers. He is gunned down and dies of his injuries.

The beginning of the Blackest Night series shows that his remains are in the Justice League's storage facilities for dead supervillains. He is one of many dead supervillains revived as members of the Black Lantern Corps.

DC Rebirth
DC Comics included Cavalier in "DC Rebirth", a line-wide revision of the fictional history and characters portrayed in the DC Comics superhero comic book line. In this revised version, Cavalier wears the costume traditionally worn by Pyle, but his real name is unknown. Cavalier is one of the many villains taken down by Batman and Catwoman after he takes her along with him on an average night of his job.

While imprisoned he joined the Suicide Squad but was killed on his first mission.

Powers and abilities
While he has no superhuman abilities, the Cavalier is a skilled athlete, hand-to-hand combatant, and swordsman who carries a rapier that emits electric blasts. Additionally, the feather plume in his hat is a steel-tipped dart.

In other media

Television
 The Cavalier was considered to appear in The New Batman Adventures. Regarding the character, producer and writer Paul Dini once stated: "We've thought about using the Cavalier, and will probably get around to telling his story sooner or later". Later, Dini stated that the Cavalier's chances for an appearance in the series had become a "long shot". Ultimately, the Cavalier did not appear in the show.
 The Mortimer Drake incarnation of the Cavalier appears in Batman: The Brave and the Bold, voiced by Greg Ellis. This version has a stereotypical Elizabethan era accent.
 The Mortimer Drake incarnation of the Cavalier appears in the DC Super Hero Girls episode "#DramaQueen", voiced by Griffin Puatu. This version is a student and stage actor at Metropolis High School who holds a grudge against Zatanna for upstaging him in an elementary school play.

Miscellaneous
 The Cavalier appears in the BBC radio adaptation of Batman: Knightfall, voiced by Kerry Shale.
 The Cavalier appears in The Batman Adventures #1.

See also
 List of Batman family enemies

References

External links
 DCU Guide: Cavalier (Mortimer Drake)
 DCU Guide: Cavalier (Hudson Pyle)

Characters created by James Robinson
DC Comics LGBT supervillains
DC Comics male supervillains
Fictional gay males
Golden Age supervillains
Comics characters introduced in 1943
Characters created by Bob Kane
Comics characters introduced in 1992
Fictional swordfighters in comics
Batman characters
Suicide Squad members
Vigilante characters in comics